is a Japanese wheelchair tennis player who won the British Open in 2014. She played in doubles along with Marc McCarroll of Great Britain.

References

External links
 
 

1975 births
Living people
Japanese female tennis players
Wheelchair tennis players
Paralympic wheelchair tennis players of Japan
Wheelchair tennis players at the 2016 Summer Paralympics
20th-century Japanese women
21st-century Japanese women